Arcangelo Ianelli (July 18, 1922 in São Paulo – May 26, 2009) was a painter, sculptor and illustrator from Brazil, who was involved with an artistic group called Grupo Guanabara, along with Manabu Mabe (1924–1997), Yoshiya Takaoka (1909–1978) and Tikashi Fukushima (1920–2001). His brother, Tomás Ianelli, was also a painter. He was the father of the painter Rubens Ianelli and grandfather of the poet Mariana Ianelli.

His work and style is briefly described in the 2019 novel Fake Like Me by Barbara Bourland.

See also 
 List of Brazilian painters

Bibliography 
 ALMEIDA, Paulo Mendes de. Ianelli: do figurativo ao abstrato. Presentation Aracy Amaral; texts by Aracy Amaral; Juan Acha; Marc Berkowitz; Jacob Klintowitz. São Paulo, 1978.

References 

20th-century Brazilian painters
20th-century Brazilian male artists
Brazilian people of Italian descent
2009 deaths
1922 births